The men's long jump at the 1988 Summer Olympics in Seoul, South Korea had a start list of 41 competitors from 31 nations, with two qualifying groups (41 jumpers) before the final (12) took place on Sunday September 25, 1988. The maximum number of athletes per nation had been set at 3 since the 1930 Olympic Congress. 

The event was won by Carl Lewis of the United States, the nation's second consecutive and 18th overall gold medal in the men's long jump. It was Lewis's second gold medal of the Games (after Ben Johnson's disqualification in the 100 metres elevated Lewis to gold in that event) as he tried to defend his 1984 quadruple; he would later come short in the 200 metres (taking silver) and did not even get to compete in the 4 × 100 metres relay (the heats team fumbled an exchange and did not qualify for the final).

The American team completed a medals sweep in the event for the first time since 1904 (they had also done it at the first Games in 1896). Mike Powell took silver. Larry Myricks finally won an Olympic medal; he was on track to be part of a medal-sweeping team in 1976 before breaking his foot in warmups for the final, he was the favorite in 1980 before the United States boycotted the Games, and he had come in fourth in 1984.

Background

This was the 21st appearance of the event, which is one of 12 athletics events to have been held at every Summer Olympics. The returning finalists from the 1984 Games were gold medalist Carl Lewis of the United States, bronze medalist Giovanni Evangelisti of Italy, fourth-place finisher Larry Myricks of the United States, seventh-place finisher Junichi Usui of Japan, eighth-place finisher Kim Jong-il of South Korea, and tenth-place finisher Antonio Corgos of Spain. The 1984 silver medalist, Gary Honey of Australia, was entered but did not start. Lewis and Myricks were the favorites; their new teammate, Mike Powell, was also a challenger.

Algeria, Bangladesh, Qatar, Saint Vincent and the Grenadines, Sierra Leone, and Swaziland each made their first appearance in the event. The United States appeared for the 20th time, most of any nation, having missed only the boycotted 1980 Games.

Competition format

The 1988 competition used the two-round format with divided final introduced in 1952. The qualifying round gave each competitor three jumps to achieve a distance of 8.00 metres; if fewer than 12 men did so, the top 12 (including all those tied) would advance. The final provided each jumper with three jumps; the top eight jumpers received an additional three jumps for a total of six, with the best to count (qualifying round jumps were not considered for the final).

Records

The standing world and Olympic records prior to the event were as follows.

No new world or Olympic records were set during the competition.

Schedule

All times are Korea Standard Time adjusted for daylight savings (UTC+10)

Results

Qualifying

Final

See also
 1986 Men's European Championships Long Jump (Stuttgart)
 1987 Men's World Championships Long Jump (Rome)
 1990 Men's European Championships Long Jump (Split)
 1991 Men's World Championships Long Jump (Tokyo)

References

External links
  Official Report
  todor66

 1
Long jump at the Olympics
Men's events at the 1988 Summer Olympics